The Farmall 340 is a medium-sized row-crop tractor, first produced as part of the Farmall line by International Harvester in 1957. The 340 was a completely new design, unrelated to its predecessor the Farmall 350. Production ran until 1963 for the Farmall model, while production under the International and International Harvester name ran until 1965.

Description
The 340 used a new   four-cylinder gasoline engine, connected to a torque amplifier that gave an effective range of ten gears. A diesel version had a  engine, with the same horsepower. The 340's new hydraulic system used transmission oil is the hydraulic fluid. The International Harvester IH 340 was the utility version, and the International 340 was the industrial version. A crawler version was sold as the T-340, or the TD-340 with a diesel engine. The Farmall 340 was offered in an orchard and grove configuration. Crawler versions were sold until 1965. About 8,00 were produced, the gasoline models selling for about $3,600 and the diesels for about $4,300.

Comparable products
The Case 441 and Massey MF33 were comparable to the 340.

References

External links
NTTL Test #665 - McCormick-Farmall Model 340 at the Nebraska Tractor Test Laboratory archive

Farmall tractors